Alcides Emigdio Lanza (born 2 June 1929) is a Canadian composer, conductor, pianist, and music educator of Argentinian birth. He became a naturalized Canadian citizen in 1976. As both a composer and performer he is known as an exponent of contemporary classical music and avant-garde music. His works often utilize a combination of traditional and unusual instruments, and incorporate electronic sounds and extensions. He is also known for using special lighting effects when presenting his music. Many of his compositions are published by Boosey & Hawkes, and lanza himself owns his own publishing company, Shelan Editions. He is an associate of the Canadian Music Centre, a member of the Canadian League of Composers., and an Honorary Member of the Canadian Electroacoustic Community.

Education
Born in Rosario, Santa Fe, lanza received his initial musical training in Buenos Aires where he was a pupil of Julián Bautista (music composition), Ruwin Erlich (piano), Alberto Ginastera (composition), and Roberto Kinsky (conducting). He received a scholarship from the Torcuato di Tella Institute in 1963-1964 which enabled him to pursue advanced studies in music composition and electronic music. He received further grants from the Ford Foundation (1966) and the Pan American Union (1967–1969) and was awarded a Guggenheim Fellowship (1965). All of these enabled him to pursue further training in the United States with such teachers as Olivier Messiaen, Riccardo Malipiero, Aaron Copland, Bruno Maderna, and Yvonne Loriod.

Career
From 1959-1965, lanza was a pianist and vocal coach at the Teatro Colón in Buenos Aires. He also served as the President of Agrupacion Música Viva during that time. While studying in the United States during the late 1960s he worked at the Columbia-Princeton Electronic Music Center with Vladimir Ussachevsky. In 1971 he moved to Canada, joining the music faculty of McGill University in the city of Montreal. Since 1974 he has been director of that school's electronic music program. Among his notable pupils are composers Peter Allen, Eli-Eri Moura, and John Burke. 

In 1965 alcides lanza purchased several Super Balls as toys for his son and soon experimented with the sounds they made when rubbed along the frame or strings of a piano.  lanza, in his composition Plectros III (1971), said the performer should use a pair of Super Balls on sticks as mallets with which to strike and rub the strings and case of a piano.

In 1972 lanza became the director of the Société de musique contemporaine du Québec (SMCQ), remaining in that role for only a short time. The SMCQ later commissioned him to write Plectros IV which was premiered in 1975 by Bruce Mather and Pierrette LePage. In 1972-1973 he was composer-in-residence at the German Academic Exchange Service in Berlin and he gave recital tours in Scandinavia and Germany. He went on to found the Composers/Performers Group, an organization who has garnered much controversy among critics for their multimedia presentations in cities like New York City and Montreal. In 1986 he toured Argentina and Brazil with his wife, actress and singer Meg Sheppard, in concerts of Canadian music. 
He is an honorary member of the ″Colegio de Compositores Latinoamericanos de Música de Arte″, founded by the Mexican composer Manuel de Elías.

References

External links
 McGill home page
 Blog on Blogspot

1929 births
Living people
Argentine expatriates in Canada
Canadian classical pianists
Canadian composers
Canadian male composers
Male conductors (music)
Academic staff of McGill University
Canadian music educators
Pupils of Aaron Copland
Pupils of Bruno Maderna
Canadian male pianists
21st-century Canadian conductors (music)
21st-century Canadian pianists